Eunaticina papilla , the papilla moon snail, is a species of predatory sea snail, a marine gastropod mollusk in the family Naticidae, the moon snails.

Description
The size of an adult shell varies between 8 mm and 35 mm.

Distribution
This species occurs in the Red Sea, in the Indian Ocean along Madagascar and in the Pacific Ocean along Melanesia.

References

 Dautzenberg, Ph. (1929). Mollusques testacés marins de Madagascar. Faune des Colonies Francaises, Tome III
 Vine, P. (1986). Red Sea Invertebrates. Immel Publishing, London. 224 pp
 Beu A.G. (2004) Marine Mollusca of oxygen isotope stages of the last 2 million years in New Zealand. Part 1: Revised generic positions and recognition of warm-water and cool-water migrants. Journal of the Royal Society of New Zealand 34(2): 111-265. page(s): 206

External links

Naticidae
Gastropods described in 1791